The Government Actuary’s Department (GAD) provides actuarial solutions including risk analysis, modelling and advice to support the UK public sector. It is a department of the Government of the United Kingdom.

GAD applies the actuarial profession's technical skills, consultancy discipline, high standards of professionalism and industry sector knowledge to solve financial challenges faced by the UK public sector.

The department is part of the analysis function in government responsible for providing actuarial advice to public sector clients. 
Its mission is to improve the stewardship of the public sector finances by supporting effective decision-making and robust financial reporting through actuarial analysis, modelling and advice.

Five-year strategy 
The GAD 2025 Strategy focuses on 4 main areas; clients, people, inclusion and processes, setting out aims and priorities in each section.

GAD provides actuarial and specialist analysis, advice and assurance in:

 insurance and investment
 data, modelling and quality assurance
 pensions and social security

Annual Report and Accounts 
The most recent Annual Report and Accounts (2020 to 2021) for the Government Actuary's Department is available to view online.

History
In 1912 the Government appointed a chief actuary to the National Health Insurance Joint Committee, following the Old Age Pensions Act 1908 and the National Insurance Act 1911. As the role of the Chief Actuary expanded, the post of Government Actuary was created in 1917.  The Government Actuary's Department was formed 2 years later.

The role of GAD within government expanded significantly in the 1940s and 1950s, coinciding with an expansion of the state’s role in pensions, social security and health care.

By the 1980s GAD had grown into a significant actuarial consultancy within government and in 1989 the financing of GAD through an annual Parliamentary vote of funds was replaced by a system of directly charging users of GAD’s services.  The calculation of GAD's fees is based solely on the recovery of its costs.

GAD has about 200 people across 2 offices (London and Edinburgh), of whom around 165 are actuaries and analysts.

List of government actuaries
The government actuary is the individual actuary that is responsible for the overall running and leadership of GAD. The holders of this role have been:

 Alfred Watson, 14 May 1917 – 7 May 1936
 George Epps, 19 May 1936 – 30 November 1944
 Percy Harvey, 1 December 1944 – 30 August 1946
 George Maddex, 31 August 1946 – 31 March 1958
 Herbert Tetley, 1 April 1958 – 30 April 1973
 Edward Johnston, 1 May 1973 – 14 April 1989
 Christopher Daykin, 15 April 1989 – October 2007
 Trevor Llanwarne, May 2008 – August 2014
 Martin Clarke, August 2014 – present

Timeline of government actuaries

References

External links
Official site

Pensions in the United Kingdom
Non-ministerial departments of the Government of the United Kingdom
1919 establishments in the United Kingdom